Yoganayagipuram is a village in the Orathanadu taluk of Thanjavur district, Tamil Nadu, India.

Demographics 

As per the 2001 census, Yoganayagipuram had a total population of 131 with 58 males and 73 females. The sex ratio was 1259. The literacy rate was 70.49.

References 

 

Villages in Thanjavur district